Empire Falls is a two-part American television miniseries that aired on HBO in the spring of 2005. It is based on the 2001 novel by Richard Russo. The miniseries was nominated for and won multiple awards, including various Primetime Emmy Awards and Golden Globe Awards. It is directed by Fred Schepisi.

Plot
Set in the small, decaying, nearly bankrupt town of Empire Falls, Maine, this is the story of Miles Roby, the unassuming manager of the Empire Grill, who has spent his entire life in the town.

He has an ex-wife, Janine, who has become a cocky, selfish bachelorette after losing weight and exercising rigorously. This is partly due to encouragement from Walt Comeau, an antagonistic fitness center owner who visits the Empire Grill every day and has moved into Roby's old house by this point.

Roby also has a loving teenage daughter, nicknamed "Tick", who is dealing with Zack Minty, her cruel ex-boyfriend, plus an emotional conflict over her mother's engagement to Walt, whom Tick despises. In addition, she has a complicated friendship with John Voss, an emotionally disturbed boy at school whose hard-luck story is known all too well around town. The obnoxious jock Zack and his friends constantly bully John.

Other important people in Miles' life include Max, his grubby ne'er-do-well father, a rascal who can't resist a handout when it comes his way; David, Miles' reformed marijuana smoking brother, who is a talented Empire Grill cook; Bea, Miles' good-hearted ex-mother-in-law, who owns a bar; the town's wealthiest woman, a condescending matron who owns the Empire Grill; that woman's daughter, who has loved Miles for many years; an attractive waitress; a retiring police chief; and a dimwitted police officer, Jimmy Minty, who is Zack's father and has known Miles since childhood.

Miles is plagued by flashbacks of his family when he was a child, including a mysterious affair between his mother and a suitor, the details of which might answer some questions Miles has had his entire life.

Characters
 Miles Roby (Ed Harris) – The middle-aged central character of the story. Miles is the seemingly content manager of the Empire Grill in Empire Falls, Maine and is divorced with one teenaged daughter. A blue-collar gentleman with his principles intact, he lives in an apartment over the restaurant he has managed ever since he dropped out of college to look after his dying mother. However, this has left him constantly accountable to Francine Whiting, causing others to persuade him to open a business of his own.
 Janine Roby (Helen Hunt) – Miles' ex-wife. She has developed a selfish attitude, damaging her relationship with her daughter and annoying her mother. She gained ownership of the house and custody of their daughter while Miles ended up in an apartment above the Empire Grill. Janine resents the close relationship that exists between father and daughter. As the story progresses, Janine finds that tables are turning on her for the worst.
 Christina "Tick" Roby (Danielle Panabaker) – Miles' daughter. She enjoys a loving relationship with both her father and grandfather. Tick is smart, friendly, and more sympathetic than most of her classmates. Her mother's engagement has a negative impact on her. She despises Walt, who is trying to act like a father figure, and resents her mother.
 Max Roby (Paul Newman) – Miles' father. Disheveled and constantly defiant of those around him, Max has no problem saying what he thinks of people, even directly to their faces. He is happy to accept any "handout" (or to take anything he wants) even when it means stealing money from the church. Max has a lifelong affinity for Key West, Florida. Despite being a vagabond, Max loves his sons and granddaughter and is a great deal wiser than people assume him to be. (This was Paul Newman's final onscreen role. He is played by Josh Lucas in flashback)
 Charlie Mayne (Philip Seymour Hoffman) – A mysterious suitor to Miles' mother and a symbolic figure in Miles' life. Charlie's involvement is pivotal with regard to why Miles has lived in Empire Falls his entire life.
 Grace Roby (Robin Wright Penn) – Miles' late mother. She considers her son the jewel of her eye. Her affair with Charlie plays a crucial role in Miles' life.
 Francine Whiting (Joanne Woodward) – The town's wealthiest citizen. The manipulative Francine holds puppet strings over the town, in particular Miles, and has no problem pulling them when it suits her unscrupulous agenda. Her condescending manner veils a cunning woman with ulterior motives.
 David Roby (Aidan Quinn) – Miles' younger brother. A former alcoholic, a reformed marijuana plant grower and a car-crash survivor, David is the chief cook at the Empire Grill. His talent brings a considerable amount of business to the diner. He encourages Miles to take risks, having promised their mother to watch after Miles. It is also implied that David is actually Miles's half-brother, through flashbacks with their mother and Charlie Mayne.
 Walt Comeau (Dennis Farina) – Janine's fiance and the owner of a fitness club. Walt is extroverted and arrogant. He lives with Janine in Miles' old house, trying to develop a fatherly relationship with Tick. Walt makes daily appearances at the restaurant to challenge Miles to an arm-wrestling match. He has a couple of skeletons in his closet, hidden (temporarily) from Janine.
 John Voss (Lou Taylor Pucci) – Tick's awkward, introverted classmate. He is from a deprived family, wears ragged, dirty clothing and is known to live with his grandmother after his parents abandoned him. He's constantly ridiculed by Tick's ex-boyfriend, Zack Minty. His history has created a dangerous aura about him, one that eventually escalates. No one but Tick pays enough attention to him until it's too late.
 Cindy Whiting (Kate Burton) – Francine's daughter. Despite being permanently disabled by a car accident, she is a sweet woman with high spirits. She has a long-standing attraction to Miles; he is aware of it and is sympathetic but does not feel the same way.
 Jimmy Minty (William Fichtner) – A dull-witted, unscrupulous police officer and former classmate of Miles. He is not well liked by most of the town, although he believes he is. Francine keeps him in her pocket by providing perks such as a red sports car. He has an eye on becoming chief of police one day, and unfortunately, has keys to most of the town's businesses which he uses to his advantage. He and Miles ultimately come to blows.
 Zack Minty (Trevor Morgan) – Son of Jimmy Minty, Tick's ex-boyfriend and a high school bully. A football star who is an obnoxious and cruel punk, Zack gets away with his bad behavior because of his popularity and his father's status as a police officer. He loves tormenting John to the point of breaking into his house, and is indirectly responsible for making John reach his breaking point.
 Bea (Estelle Parsons) – Janine's wise mother. Ex-mother-in-law to Miles, they remain good friends. Bea frequently takes Miles' side rather than Janine's, and often makes rather pointed remarks about Janine's behavior. She owns a local bar and wants Miles to go into business with her.
 Charlene (Theresa Russell) – Waitress at the Empire Grill. She is aware that Miles is attracted to her, and she's kind to him, but she is dating David.
 Bill Daws (Stephen Mendillo) – The compassionate chief of police and a friend to Miles. He is dying of cancer and is undergoing chemotherapy which takes a heavy toll on his health, confiding only in Miles with the news.
 Horace (Jeffrey DeMunn) – A local reporter and a regular patron at the grill. He is an intellectual with a heavy Maine accent and has intimate knowledge of what goes on around town. He has a prominent cyst on his forehead and Max often tactlessly refers to it.
 Father Mark (Adam LeFevre) – A friendly priest. He works at a decrepit church, which he has hired Miles to paint.
 Father Tom (Nesbitt Blaisdell) – An elderly priest. He is becoming senile and behaves erratically. (For example, at one point he helps Max steal money from the church)
 Otto Meyer (Larry Pine) – Principal of the high school. A childhood friend of Miles, he is an honorable man who watches out for students like John and Tick. He plays a pivotal role when John "snaps." (Pine also serves as narrator for the film)
 Candace (Delia Robertson) – Tick's classmate and best friend. She finds some amusement when Zack picks on John, but is inevitably involved when John reaches his breaking point.
 Justin (Tony Takacs) – Zack's best friend. Overweight, with a penchant for junk food, he participates with Zack in taunting John, although he draws limits when Zack breaks into John's house. He, too, is affected by John's revenge.

Awards and nominations

References

External links
 HBO Films – Empire Falls
 

2000s American television miniseries
HBO original programming
Television shows based on American novels
Best Miniseries or Television Movie Golden Globe winners
Primetime Emmy Award-winning television series
Films set in Maine
Films shot in Maine